Thomas Eagar Sears (1911–1975), was a male English international table tennis player.

Table tennis career
He won a silver medal in the men's team event at the 1931 World Table Tennis Championships. He also won two English Open titles and captained England.

Personal life
Sears was a warehouse manager at W.H Smith Supply Centre from 1926 to 1973. He was also a Japanese prisoner of war.

See also
 List of England players at the World Team Table Tennis Championships
 List of World Table Tennis Championships medalists

References

English male table tennis players
1911 births
1975 deaths
World Table Tennis Championships medalists